Diego Ferrari (born 17 November 1970) is an Italian former professional racing cyclist. He rode in three editions of the Giro d'Italia.

References

External links

1970 births
Living people
Italian male cyclists
Cyclists from Cremona